The Havasupai people (Havasupai: Havsuw' Baaja) are an American Indian tribe who have lived in the Grand Canyon for at least the past 800 years. Havasu means "blue-green water" and pai "people".

Located primarily in an area known as Havasu Canyon, this Yuman-speaking population once laid claim to an area the size of Delaware. In 1882, however, the tribe was forced by the federal government to abandon all but  of its land. A silver rush and the Santa Fe Railroad in effect destroyed the fertile land. Furthermore, the inception of the Grand Canyon as a national park in 1919 pushed the Havasupai to the brink, as their land was consistently being used by the National Park Service. Throughout the 20th century, the tribe used the US judicial system to fight for the restoration of the land.

As a means of survival, the tribe has turned to tourism, attracting thousands of people annually to its streams and waterfalls at the Havasupai Indian Reservation.

History

Relation with Hualapai 
Ethnically, the Havasupai and the Hualapai are one people, although today, they are politically separate groups as the result of U.S. government policy. The Hualapai (Pa'a or Pai) had three subtribes: the Plateau People, Middle Mountain People and Yavapai Fighter. The subtribes were divided into seven bands, which themselves were broken up into thirteen regional bands or local groups. The local groups were composed of several extended family groups, living in small villages: The Havasupai were just the Havasooa Pa'a regional band (or local group) of the Nyav-kapai ("Eastern People") of the Plateau People subtribe.

Pre-1882 
The tribe had traditionally relied heavily on agriculture, hunting and gathering as their means of survival. Although living primarily above and inside the Grand Canyon, which consists mostly of harsh terrain, the tribe's reservation was also home to some lush vegetation and aquamarine blue water of Havasu Creek. Their name, meaning "the People of the Blue-Green Waters" reflects this.

The Havasupai are said to have existed within and around the Grand Canyon for over eight centuries. Little is known about the tribe prior to their first recorded European encounter in 1776 with Spanish priest Francisco Garcés. Garcés reported seeing roughly 320 individuals in his time with the Havasupai, a number that would diminish over the centuries as westward expansion and natural catastrophes significantly decreased the population size.

In the first half of the 19th century, with exception to the introduction of horses by the Spanish, U.S. westward expansion affected the Havasupai less than it did other indigenous populations of the west. Even as interaction with settlers slowly increased, day-to-day life did not change much for the tribe until silver was discovered in 1870 by Cataract Creek. The migration of prospectors to the area was unwelcome. The Havasupai sought protection from the intrusion of western pioneers on their land and sought out assistance, but to little avail. An executive order by President Rutherford Hayes in 1880 established a small federally protected reservation for the tribe, yet it did not include the mining areas along the Creek (Hirst, 1985).

During this era, Havasupai relations with other Native American tribes were generally mixed. Bonds and interactions with the Hopi tribe, whose reservation was in close proximity, were strong, as the two peoples did a great deal of trading with each other. The Hopi introduced crops such as the gourd and sunflower that would eventually become a staple of the Havasupai diet. Still, the Havasupai were not without enemies as they were consistently at odds with the Yavapai and the Southern Paiute, who would steal and destroy crops planted by the Havasupai.

1882–1920 

In 1882 President Chester A. Arthur issued an executive order that all land on the plateau of the canyon, which was traditionally used for winter homes for the tribe, was to become public property of the United States. The order in effect relegated the Havasupai to a  plot of land in Cataract Canyon, taking almost all of their aboriginal land for American public use. According to reports, the Havasupai were completely unaware of the act for several years.

The loss of almost all of their land was not the only issue that the Havasupai were contending with: the increase in the number of settlers in the local region had depleted game used for hunting, and soil erosion (a result of poor irrigation techniques) touched off a series of food shortages. Furthermore, interaction with the settlers sparked deadly disease outbreaks amongst tribe members, who were ravaged by smallpox, influenza, and measles. By 1906 only 166 tribal members remainedhalf the number Garcés saw when he first came across the tribe in 1776.  At one point, there were only 40 women and 40 men of childbearing age, which caused a genetic population bottleneck.

In the 1800s the continental railway system was greatly expanded. In 1897 construction opened on a spur line of the Santa Fe Railroad, which was to lead directly to the Grand Canyon; by 1901 the line was open. During his visit to the Grand Canyon in 1903, President Theodore Roosevelt met two Havasupais at Indian Garden. Roosevelt told them about the park that was being created, and that they would have to leave the area. In 1908 the Grand Canyon was declared a national monument, and by 1919 it had received National Park status. However, it was not until 1928 that the Havasupai finally left Indian Garden, forced out by the National Park Service.

1921–1975 
Issues regarding health within the Havasupai population reduced its growth to the point where almost an entire generation was lost due to infant and child mortality. Low morale spread throughout the tribe, leading to an increase in gambling, alcoholism, and violence. As the years progressed the Havasupai came to realize that they could not hope to survive in their American social situation without embracing at least some aspects of it. Breaking horses, working on farms, or even serving as employees of the Grand Canyon National Park were all options  for tribal members. The Havasupai fought to keep their methods and traditions alive, but the federal government and the National Park Service generally held a dismissive attitude toward these efforts and accelerated the pace of actions such as razing residents' traditional homes and replacing them with cabins. As similar instances transpired throughout the years, the methods of the Park became clear: they wanted the final .

In this period the tribe continually fought with the government to have the land that had been taken returned to them. In 1968 the tribe won their Indian Claim Commission case against the United States. The court findings stated that the Havasupai had portions of their land taken from them illegally in 1882 and that the tribe was entitled to recover the land from the US at fair market value (ICC 210). That value ended up being 55 cents an acre, totaling just over one million dollars. Although the case was a landmark for the Havasupai in the sense that it was proven in a court of law that the federal government had inappropriately taken their land, it had still not been properly returned to the tribe.

However, the momentum that the Havasupai gained from the ICC case followed them into the 1970s as the tribe continued to fight to have their traditional territory returned to them. In 1974, garnering support from the Nixon administration as well as influential newspapers such as the Los Angeles Times, the Wall Street Journal, and the San Francisco Chronicle, the tribe made their push to have the congressional bill S. 1296, which would actually return their land, passed through Congress. Months of deliberation and stalling on the part of some congressmen almost led to the demise of the bill, but days before Congress went on fall break the bill was finally passed by both Houses and made its way to the President's desk. Similarly, the bill sat on President Gerald Ford's desk until the final possible moments before it was signed and passed into law on January 4, 1975.

Mining interests also had a presence in the canyon in this period. The largest of the mines is in Carbonate Canyon, adjacent to Havasu Falls, where rails and timbers still can be found descending three levels. Lead was mined here for the last time during WWII. Ranger Gale Burak, who worked at the Grand Canyon for several years, spoke of her experiences as a cook for the Havasu Lead and Zinc Company hard rock mining camp, where the campground now resides. Below Mooney Falls, the famous pipe "ladder" ascended to a vanadium deposit.

1976–present 
 Following the return of a large share of their land, the Havasupai as a tribe have once again begun to flourish. Although many of the day-to-day customs that existed prior to 1882 are not well established today, the Havasupai have continued to respect and preserve the traditions of their ancestors. As of 2019 the tribe consists of about 730 members, of which about 400 live on the reservation.

Presently, the tribe has begun to take advantage of the beauty of its land by turning it into a tourist destination for visitors to the Grand Canyon. Tribal members often work as packers and/or workers for tourist ventures, or work at the lodge, tourist offices, the café, etc.

2003–2010 blood sample controversy 
In 2003, protests ensued when it was found that Arizona State University had used blood samples consensually acquired from the Havasupai people to "study the causes of behavioral/medical disorders", with an initial goal of determining whether the high rates of Type 2 diabetes among Havasupai adults were due to the same gene that causes high rates of diabetes in the Pima people.  Multiple genetic research studies were done without the consent or permission of the Havasupai <Morton, 2013, 2160></MORTON, D. J., PROUDFIT, J., CALAC, D., PORTILLO, M., LOFTON-FITZSIMMONS, G., MOLINA, T., FLORES, R., LAWSON-RISSO, B., & MAJEL-MCCAULEY, R. (2013)>. Creating Research Capacity Through a Tribally Based Institutional Review Board. American Journal of Public Health, 103(12), 2160–2164.>. This included one that indicated that their ancestors' migrated from Asia to North America, which contradicts the traditional Havasupai belief that the tribe originated in the canyon.  Another showed a relatively high level of consanguinity which can result in health problems.  Although this is the normal and expected result of the population bottleneck in the early 20th century, the publication of the results made people feel stigmatized.

ASU incurred legal fees of US$1,700,000 and eventually agreed to pay the Havasupai participants US$700,000. It has since been claimed that scientific study of Native Northern American genomes has been hampered due to scientists' fears of getting caught up in a similar legal predicament.

Traditional culture

Agriculture 
Prior to modern times agriculture was the essential means of progress and survival for the Havasupai. While in the winter the tribe members stationed themselves on the plateau of the canyon, in the summer irrigation gardening of the crop fields brought the members back inside the canyon walls. As vast and uneven as the Grand Canyon is, it is somewhat of an anomaly that the Havasupai were able to agriculturally sustain and thrive in such a voluminous landscape. Because of a lack of available soil rich in nutrients, it has been suggested that the tribe cultivated only  of land on the canyon floor. Although lacking space, the tribe's irrigation technology was far more advanced than others in the Southwest which allowed them to be agriculturally intensive. However, being located at the bottom of a canyon left the fields vulnerable to flooding as a result of rain and the overflowing of Cataract Creek, as was the case in 1911 when almost an entire crop field was destroyed. In 1920 to combat the issue the federal government assisted the tribe in constructing a new irrigation system which was generally effective in ceasing soil erosion from water overflows.

Historically the main crops for the Havasupai were corn, beans, squash, sunflowers, gourds, and some cotton. Corn, the tribe's main crop, was generally harvested in the later summer months. While growing, a farming technique called cepukaka was used to protect the corn from being blown over when it got to a certain height. In this technique, a farmer loosened the soil around the corn and then pulled it into a hill around the stalk base. Along with their traditional crops, the Havasupai were introduced to melons, watermelons, and orchard trees with the arrival of the Spanish. By the 1940s these crops had become staples of the Havasupai diet.

Hunting 
The bow and arrow were of primary importance to a Havasupai hunter. Built from an unidentifiable tree, an entire process of crafting, bending, and designing went into the construction of these hunting tools. With westward expansion, however, came the introduction of the rifle; as years went by, the gun became the primary hunting device for men. The word for "arrow" began to stand in for "bullet" as well (Whiting, 1985).

Throughout the years, sheep and deer were the dominant game for the Havasupai, but small game including rabbits and squirrels were also used as food. Historically, the Havasupai hunted in large groups, and the distribution of game amongst the hunters was generally fair. In the twentieth century, however, due to overhunting and neighboring development, the populations of large game animals such as sheep became sparse. As a result, the Havasupai were forced to alter their hunting habits to adjust to the expansionists, which in turn made tribesmen less likely to share with others.

Gathering 
The gathering of wild plants and seeds was typically done by Havasupai women. Two primary methods were used: 1) knocking seeds from plants directly, and 2) the heads of plants were gathered before the seeds were ready to fall. It was desirable for the women to locate lighter foods which could easily be moved to the plateau in winter.  Additionally, dry foods that could be stored for extended periods of time to prevent spoilage were preferable. Walnuts, wild candytuft, and barrel cacti were only a few of the many plants and seeds gathered by the women throughout the spring and summer months.

Modern culture

Government 
A seven-member tribal council, which handles most policy matters, is elected once every two years.  It is led by a chairman who is elected from among the members of the council. The Bureau of Indian Affairs (BIA) is the entity charged with law enforcement and protection for the Tribe, while the Indian Health Service clinic provides health care and emergency services.

Language 

Havasupai is a dialect of the Upland Yuman language spoken by about 450 people on the Havasupai Indian Reservation in and around the Grand Canyon. It is the only Native American language in the United States spoken by 100% of its indigenous population.  The Havasupai variety is nearly identical to the variety of the Hualapai, although the two groups are socially and politically distinct (Kendall 1983:5) and employ different orthographies. The speakers of Havasupai and Hualapai consider their languages separate. It is a little more distantly related to the Yavapai language. Grammatical descriptions, vocabularies, and texts documenting Havasupai have been published (Mithun 1999:578).

Supai 

It is home to around 400 of the tribe members and is one of the most remote cities in the contiguous United States, as it can only be accessed by taking old U.S. Route 66 and traveling about  along BIA Road 18 to the trailhead. The city can be reached from the trailhead via an  hike. An alternative to the hike is a helicopter ride or a horse ride. The town has 136 houses, a café, a general store, a tourist office, a lodge, a post office, a school, among other buildings.

Tourism 
Tourism is the main source of revenue for the Havasupai tribe. The town receives 30,000 to 40,000 visitors per year. The Tribe charges for entering its land, and visitors are required to reserve either a room at their lodge or a space at the campground.

Havasupai Trail 

The trailhead is at Hualapai Hilltop, Arizona (located at the end of BIA Road 18), where there is a large parking lot, a helipad and portable toilets. The trail can be traveled by foot or horseback. Alternatively, transportation by helicopter is periodically available. Mule service can also be purchased for luggage/packs only.

Havasu Creek 

Havasu Creek runs through Supai. The creek has several waterfalls, including Havasu Falls.

Gallery

See also 
 Grand Canyon
 Grand Canyon National Park
 Havasu Creek
 In the House of Stone and Light, a 1994 song by Martin Page

References

General references
 "Depositions of Big Jim, Billy Burro, Supai Mary and Allen Akaba," Records of the Indian Claims Commission, Havasupai Tribe, Docket 91, August 4, 1950, RG 279, National Archives.
 Kendall, Martha B. 1983. "Yuman languages". In Southwest, edited by Alfonso Ortiz, pp. 4–12. Handbook of North American Indians, William C. Sturtevant, general editor, Vol. 10. Smithsonian Institution, Washington, D.C.
 Mithun, Marianne. 1999. The Languages of Native North America. Cambridge University Press.
 Braatz, Timothy. "The Question of Regional Bands and Subtribes among the Pre-Conquest Pai (Hualapai and Havasupai) Indians of Northwestern Arizona." American Indian Quarterly 22(1) (1998): 19–30.
 Dobyns, Henry F., and Robert C. Euler. 1999. "Bands of gardeners: Pai sociopolitical structure (discussion)." American Indian Quarterly 23 (3): 159–74.
 Hanna, Mark. Man of the Canyon: An Old Indian Remembers His Life. Edited by Richard G. Emerick. Orno, Maine: Northern Lights, 1992.
 Hirst, Stephen. Havsuw 'Baaja: People of the Blue Green Water. Tempe, Arizona: Walsh and Associates, 1985.
MORTON, D. J., PROUDFIT, J., CALAC, D., PORTILLO, M., LOFTON-FITZSIMMONS, G., MOLINA, T., FLORES, R., LAWSON-RISSO, B., & MAJEL-MCCAULEY, R. (2013). Creating Research Capacity Through a Tribally Based Institutional Review Board. American Journal of Public Health, 103(12), 2160–2164.
 The Havasupai Tribe of the Havasupai Reservation, Arizona, The Navajo Tribe of Indians v. the United States of America 20 Ind. Cl. Comm. 210 (1968). Havasupai Indians, edited by David Agee Horr, 343–356. New York: Garland Publishing Inc., 1974.
 Whiting, A.F. Havasupai Habitat. Tucson, Arizona: University of Arizona Press, 1985.

Further reading 
 "I Am the Grand Canyon: The Story of the Havasupai People" Hirst, Stephen, Grand Canyon Association; 3 edition (February 28, 2007)
 "A dictionary of the Havasupai language". Hinton, Leanne. Supai, Arizona 1984.
 "Gwe gnaavja". Havasu Baaja / Havasupai Tribe, Bilingual Education Program. Supai, Arizona 1985.
 "Havsuw gwaawj tñudg siitja". Havasupai Bilingual Education Program. Supai, Arizona 1970s(?).
 "Baahj muhm hatm hwag gyu". Hinton, Leanne et al., prepared by the Havasupai Bilingual Education Program. Supai, Arizona 1978.
 "Tim: Tñuda Hobaja". Hinton, Leanne et al., prepared by the Havasupai Bilingual Education Program (authors credited as "Viya Tñudv Leanne Hinton-j, Rena Crook-m, Edith Putesoy-m hmug-g yoovjgwi. Clark Jack-j"). Supai, Arizona 1978–1984.

External links 

 Official Havasupai Tribe of the Havasupai Reservation website
 ASU Grand Canyon website

 
Native American tribes in Arizona
American Indian reservations in Arizona
Federally recognized tribes in the United States
Grand Canyon
Grand Canyon history
History of Coconino County, Arizona
Native American history of Arizona